Before You Were Punk 2 is a compilation album released in 1999 by Vagrant Records.  It is a sequel to 1997's Before You Were Punk and consists of a number of late-1990s punk rock and independent bands covering songs that were popularised during the 1980s "new wave" musical movement.

In contrast to Before You Were Punk, which was released at a time when Vagrant Records did not have a large roster of artists and therefore relied on contributions from bands on other record labels, Before You Were Punk 2 features several bands that had recently signed to Vagrant.  These include No Motiv, The Hippos, The Get Up Kids, and the Gotohells.  Rocket from the Crypt would also sign to the label the following year.

Track listing

Album information
Record label: Vagrant Records
Art direction by Kristin Vanderlip
Recording details:
Track 1 recorded and mixed by Tim Pak at Woodshed Studios
Track 2 produced and mixed by Ryan Green at Motor Studios
Track 3 recorded and mixed by Chad Blinman at Audio International Studios and The Complex Studios
Track 4 recorded and mixed by Ryan Hadlock at Bear Creek Studios. Produced by MxPx and Ryan Hadlock
Track 5 recorded and mixed by Chris Fudurich at Mat Hadder Studios and Chateau Chaumont Studios. Produced by Chris Fudurich, Ariel Rechtshaid, and Rich Zahniser.
Track 6 recorded and mixed by The Bouncing Souls and Michael Ward at Big Blue Meanie Studios
Track 7 recorded by Alex Brahl and mixed by Chad Blinman at Mad Hatter Studios
Track 8 recorded and mixed by John Reis at Drag Racist Recorders in San Diego, California. Produced by Long Gone John.
Track 9 recorded and mixed by Michael Douglas and George Harris at Panda Productions
Track 10 recorded and mixed by Ryan Greene and Angus Cooke at Orange Whip Studios. Produced by Joey Cape.
Track 11 recorded and mixed by Strung Out at Hollywood Sound Studios
Track 12 recorded and mixed by Bill Stevenson and Jason Livermore at The Blasting Room in Fort Collins, Colorado.
Harmonica on track 1 performed by James Wailin
Additional vocals on track 5 performed by Rachel Haden
Horns on track 6 performed by The Pietasters horn section

1999 compilation albums
Punk rock compilation albums
New wave compilation albums
Covers albums